The Canton of Le Morne-Rouge is a former canton in the Arrondissement of Saint-Pierre on Martinique. It had 5,003 inhabitants (2012). It was disbanded in 2015. The canton comprised the commune of Le Morne-Rouge.

References

Cantons of Martinique